Members of the New South Wales Legislative Assembly  who served in the fifth parliament of New South Wales held their seats from 1864 until 1869. The 1864–65 election was held between 22 November 1864 and 10 January 1865 with parliament first meeting on 24 January 1865. The Speaker was John Hay until 31 October 1865 and then William Arnold.

By-elections
Under the constitution, ministers were required to resign to recontest their seats in a by-election when appointed. These by-elections are only noted when the minister was defeated; in general, he was elected unopposed.

See also
First Martin ministry
Fourth Cowper ministry
Second Martin ministry
Second Robertson ministry
Results of the 1864–65 New South Wales colonial election
Candidates of the 1864–65 New South Wales colonial election

References

Members of New South Wales parliaments by term
19th-century Australian politicians